Peter H. Sears (May 18, 1937 – July 20, 2017) was an American poet based in Oregon. In 2014, he was named the seventh poet laureate of the U.S. state of Oregon.

Literary career
Sears was born in New York City on May 18, 1937. He graduated from Yale University and the Iowa Writers' Workshop. He won the 1999 Peregrine Smith Poetry Competition and the 2000 Western States Poetry Prize for his book of poems, The Brink. His first book-length collection, Tour, was published in 1987. He has also published four chapbooks of poetry and two teaching books, Secret Writing and Gonna Bake Me a Rainbow Poem. His work has been published in many magazines and literary journals, widely anthologized and included in the radio series, The Writer's Almanac. His most recent full-length book is titled Green Diver.

Sears founded and managed the Oregon Literary Coalition and co-founded the non-profit organization Friends of William Stafford.

Sears moved to Oregon in 1974 to teach creative writing at Reed College, he also taught at the Northwest Writing Institute at Lewis & Clark College and Portland Community College. He was active in the publishing company Rubberstampmadness Inc. in Corvallis and Community of Writers in Portland.

References

5. Portland Community College Online Staff Directory (June 17, 2016)https://www.pcc.edu/scripts/sdquery.pl?all=peter.sears%40pcc.edu

External links
 Official website

1937 births
2017 deaths
American male poets
Lewis & Clark College faculty
Writers from New York City
Writers from Corvallis, Oregon
Poets from Oregon
Poets Laureate of Oregon
Portland Community College faculty
Reed College faculty
University of Iowa alumni
Yale University alumni
20th-century American poets
20th-century American male writers
21st-century American poets
21st-century American male writers